The Arrival Van is a battery electric cargo van produced by Arrival. It will be marketed from 2022.

History
The pre-production prototype of a fully electric van, which was also the first vehicle developed by the British company Arrival, was presented in August 2017. Arrival developed the Van in partnership with UPS, who had plans to deploy 35 prototypes in London and Paris in 2017 as a trial.

In 2020, UPS took a minority stake in Arrival and ordered 10,000 Vans with advanced driver-assistance systems that will be used in the United States and Europe. The custom UPS Vans are scheduled to be delivered by 2024, and the contract includes an option for an additional 10,000 Vans. Including the option, Arrival expects US$1.2 billion in revenue from the UPS contract.

Arrival achieved European type certification and whole vehicle type approval for the Van in June 2022.

Assembly
The Arrival microfactory concept uses multifunctional robots to reduce the number of human workers and machines, with an estimated US$50 million needed to build a new microfactory, approximately 5% the cost of a conventional automobile assembly line. The radical reduction in capital costs is expected to allow the company "to build vehicles profitably at really any volume", according to Avinash Rugoobur, Arrival's president. Arrival have an annual production volume target of 10,000 vehicles per microfactory, providing a gross margin of $100 million for each plant, including operating expenses.

The plant in Bicester, England was chosen as the lead Van microfactory and Arrival had completed robotic tool installation there by May 2022; the start of Van production is scheduled for Autumn 2022. United States production also is scheduled to begin in the fourth quarter of 2022 at the second Arrival Van microfactory in Charlotte, North Carolina; the Charlotte microfactory will fill the UPS order of up to 10,000 Vans. Tools for the Charlotte microfactory were scheduled to be installed in late summer 2022. Additional planned microfactories will be built in Rock Hill, South Carolina and Madrid, Spain.

In August 2022, Arrival slashed its forecast for vehicles delivered in 2022 from 400–600 to 20 and announced it would reorganize to cut costs, possibly including layoffs. As part of the reorganization, the start of production at Charlotte slipped to 2023. The first Arrival Van was produced at Bicester in late September 2022; however, serial production did not commence, as the Bicester Van production for 2022 was set aside for testing, validation, and quality control. Arrival announced in October 2022 the Bicester Van plant would be wound down and the company would shift its focus to Van production in Charlotte, citing the size of the potential market in North America, the Inflation Reduction Act, and its tax credits as influencing its decision. Limited production of Vans will continue in Bicester, but that microfactory will not be scaled up to mass production; Arrival also have paused development and production of its Bus and Car. Arrival announced in November that it does not expect to deliver any Vans to customers before 2024.

Design
In pre-production renderings of the prototype Van, the smallest Royal Mail vehicle was a futuristic, curved single-body all-electric van with a large glazed area around the driver's seat, led by an almost-flat front with very little slope, large windshield, and angular proportions, which was praised by the press as "the cutest", prompting one writer to say the Van left them "inexplicably happy". Another reporter said the similar prototype UPS Vans "look like they've rolled straight out of Pixar's Cars series."

The final design for series production underwent extensive visual changes, making its debut in March 2021. While maintaining the single-body silhouette, the Van gained a more protruding and heaped front part of the body painted black. Access to the cabin was possible thanks to a sliding door, and apart from the driver's seat, there was also an additional fold-out jump seat for an occasional passenger.

Construction
The production Arrival Van uses an aluminum frame with a composite body that uses a proprietary blend of plastic and fiberglass in lieu of steel and structural adhesives instead of welds. Because the body panels are composite, they are dyed during production, eliminating the need for a separate paint shop following assembly.

The Van has a modular design; one of the nine modules is the high-voltage traction battery, offered in a range of capacities.

Powertrain

Arrival offers a choice of four battery capacities, with corresponding differences in range. The batteries use a lithium ion chemistry and the cells are supplied by LG Chem.

Notes

Maximum recharging rate is 120 kW (DC) or 11 kW (AC).

Cargo

Arrival plan to market the Van with a combination of three different roof heights (H1, H2, and H3) and five different vehicle lengths (L1, L2, L3, L4, and L5). The H3L4 Van will be the first put into production. Preliminary specifications released in March 2021 indicated the L5 length option had been dropped.

Driver assistance and autonomy
The Arrival Van is equipped with advanced driver-assistance systems, including lane keeping assistance, blind spot monitoring, automatic emergency braking, and traffic sign recognition.

Arrival also are developing autonomous vehicle driving systems. A Van prototype was fitted with a Level 4 automated driving system as part of Arrival's Robopilot project; the Robopilot Van successfully completed a route within a closed package depot in August 2021. Arrival's approach to autonomy relies primarily on machine vision.

Gallery

References

External links
  (US-English)

Vans
Electric vans
Commercial vehicles
Cars introduced in 2021
Front-wheel-drive vehicles
Arrival (company)